The 1950 East German Championship season was the second season of ice hockey in East Germany. It was contested in 1950 as part of the first Winter Sports Championship. Six teams participated in the tournament, and SG Frankenhausen won the championship.

First round

Final round

4th-6th place

1Game between SG Schierke and BSG KWU Erfurt was not contested.

References

External links
East German results 1949-1970

East
1950 in East German sport
DDR-Oberliga (ice hockey) seasons
Ger